was the forty-seventh of the sixty-nine stations of the Nakasendō connecting Edo with Kyoto in Edo period Japan. It is located in former Mino Province in what is now part of the city of Mizunami, Gifu Prefecture, Japan. Alternative kanji for the post town are 大久手.

History
Ōkute was a settlement on the ancient Tōsandō highway from the Nara period, which preceded the construction of the Nakasendō. Between Ōi and Ōkute, the road was very narrow and mountainous and goes through 13 passes (Jusan-toge), with irregular stone steps in places. In the early Edo period, the system of post stations on the Nakasendō was formalized by the Tokugawa shogunate in 1602, and Ōkute-juku was constructed in 1604, became a stopping place for traveling merchants and was also on the sankin-kōtai route used by various western daimyō to-and-from the Shogun's court in Edo. The station itself was located with the territory of Owari Domain.

At an elevation of 512 meters above sea level, Ōkute-juku is the highest station in the Mino section of the highway. It is 358.7 kilometers from Edo.

Today, only remains of the station are part of the waki-honjin, the kosatsuba or official notice board and a few machiya. The honjin was on the hill above the city, but it has been destroyed and a school has been built at its former location.

Ōkute-juku in The Sixty-nine Stations of the Kiso Kaidō
Utagawa Hiroshige's ukiyo-e print of Ōkute-juku dates from 1835 -1838. The print is a bizarre composition showing surrealistically shaped boulders which make the work an almost abstract landscape. Two woodcutters with tall stacks of firewood on their backs are depicted climbing a steep slope and gazing at a hillside with blocks of exposed rock and weirdly-shaped pine trees and featureless hills. There is no sign of the post station.

Neighboring post towns
Nakasendō
Ōi-juku - Ōkute-juku - Hosokute-juku

References

External links

Hiroshige Kiso-Kaido series
Okute-juku on Kiso Kaido Road
Gifu Nakasendo Guide

Notes

Stations of the Nakasendō
Post stations in Gifu Prefecture
Mizunami, Gifu
Mino Province